Capulin is an unincorporated town, a post office, and a census-designated place (CDP) located in and governed by Conejos County, Colorado, United States. The Capulin post office has the ZIP Code 81124. At the United States Census 2010, the population of the Capulin CDP was 200, while the population of the 81124 ZIP Code Tabulation Area was 565 including adjacent areas.

History
The town of Capulin was established by settlers from Ojo Caliente, New Mexico in 1867. "Capulin" is a regional word for Choke Cherry.  The Capulin Post Office opened on August 10, 1881.

Geography
Capulin is located in northern Conejos County. Colorado State Highway 15 leads east  to U.S. Route 285, just north of La Jara, and west then north  to Monte Vista.

Demographics

Notable residents
Eppie Archuleta, master weaver and 1985 recipient of the National Heritage Fellowship

See also

Outline of Colorado
Index of Colorado-related articles
State of Colorado
Colorado cities and towns
Colorado census designated places
Colorado counties
Conejos County, Colorado

References

External links

Capulin @ UncoverColorado.com
Capulin, Colorado Mining Claims And Mines
Conejos County website

Census-designated places in Conejos County, Colorado
Census-designated places in Colorado
Hispanic and Latino American culture in Colorado
Populated places established in 1867